Cermin Island is an islet at the mouth of Brunei River in the Mukim Kota Batu, Brunei-Muara District, Brunei. During the Brunei Civil War, a battle unfolded on the island and it's sometimes referred to as the Peperangan Pulau Cermin (Chermin Island War). A proposal for an  protection status to be implemented on the island. The island is home to sundry vegetation and swamp forests.

Geography 
Moreover, it is filled with a dense woodland with the presence of snakes and crocodiles being recorded.

It can be noted that due to the island's close proximity to the city of Brunei, Cermin was sometimes mistaken for it.

History 
During Sultan Hassan's reign from 1582 until 1598, he was the architect of the Pulau Cermin Fortress and the bridge linking from Tanjong Kindana or also known as Tanjong Chendana, to the island. During the construction of the fortress, at least 40 boats were sunk while carrying stones across the Brunei River. A palace was defended by a fortress consisted of several cannons and connected with a long bridge.

A palace and several houses were proposed by the Pengiran Bendahara (First Minister) and later ordered by the Pehin Orang Kaya Digadong Seri Nara. Sultan Abdul Mubin then relocated the administrative capital from Kota Batu to the island during his reign from 1660 to 1673, while the Pengiran Bendahara did not. It was intended for Abdul Mubin to wait out the crisis taking place prior to the Brunei Civil War, the relocation was under the guidance of the newly appointed Bendahara (Chief Minister) Muhyiddin. After relocation to the island, Muhyiddin declared himself as the 14th Sultan of Brunei with his authority around Kampong Ayer thus sparking the only civil war in the country.

Abdul Mubin initially fled to Kinarut and stayed there for ten years until a battle was lost by the forces of Sultan Muhyiddin, this in turn caused the fight to move back into Brunei and Abdul Mubin to move back into Cermin Island. Muhyiddin then sought help from the Sultan of Sulu and requested additional forces from Sulu and negotiated that the land of eastern Sabah will be rewarded. Once forces from Sulu arrived, preparations to attack the Cermin island immediately began. As the forces from Sultan Muhyiddin landed on the island, no fighting has taken place as most fortifications were destroyed by bombardment from Tanjong Kindana, and Sultan Abdul Mubin has been executed, thus putting an end to the civil war. Prior to his execution, he has sent most of the regalia into the Brunei Bay with cannons. Abdul Mubin was buried at the Pulau Chermin Royal Cemetery on the island.

According to a 1970 journal by the Brunei Museum, potshards were collected from a small stretch beach on the island and later taken to the research headquarters in Kota Batu. Several lamellibranchs were discovered on the island in 1976.

References 

Islands of Brunei
Protected areas of Brunei